Santissima Annunziata (Italian: most holy annunciation) may refer to:

Churches in Italy
Basilica della Santissima Annunziata, Florence
Basilica della Santissima Annunziata del Vastato, Genoa
Basilica della Santissima Annunziata Maggiore, Naples
Basilica-Sanctuary of Maria Santissima Annunziata, Tràpani
Church of the Santissima Annunziata in Sturla, Genoa
Santissima Annunziata, Ascoli Piceno
Santissima Annunziata, Parma
Santissima Annunziata, Gaeta, Lazio
Santissima Annunziata, Pesaro, Marche
Santissima Annunziata, Circello, Campania
Santissima Annunziata, Rubiera, Emilia Romagna
Santissima Annunziata, Pescia, Tuscany
Santissima Annunziata, Barga, Tuscany
Sanctuary of the Santissima Annunziata, Chieri, Turin
Santissima Annunziata, Lucignano, Arezzo, Tuscany
Concattedrale della Santissima Annunziata, or Todi Cathedral, Umbria
Concattedrale della Santissma Annunziata, or Treia Cathedral, Macerata
Cattedrale di Santa Maria Annunziata, or Anagni Cathedral, Lazio
Cattedrale Maria Santissima Annunziata, or Acireale Cathedral, Sicily
Cattedrale di Santa Maria Annunziata, or Camerino Cathedral, Marche
Cattedrale di Maria SS. Annunziata, or Tursi Cathedral, Tursi, Basilicata
Basilica Concattedrale di Santa Maria Annunziata, or Otranto Cathedral
Basilica Concattedrale di Santa Maria Annunziata, or Sarsina Cathedral, Forlì-Cesena
Abbazia di Santa Maria a Pie' di Chienti, also known as the Santissima Annunziata, Montecosaro Scalo, Marche
Oratorio della Santissima Annunziata, Peretola, Florence
Oratorio della Santissima Annunziata di Collecchio, Spilamberto, Spilamberto, Modena
Church of the Santissima Annunziata dei Catalani, Messina, Sicily
Church of Santissima Annunziata, Suvereto, Livorno

Other uses
Supreme Order of the Most Holy Annunciation, or Ordine Supremo della Santissima Annunziata, a Roman Catholic order of knighthood, originating in Savoy, Italy
Piazza della Santissima Annunziata, a square in the city of Florence, Italy

See also 
 Annunziata, the Italian word for Annunciation, a given name and surname
 Annunciation